Ice Hockey Journalists UK, abbreviated to IHJUK, is an organisation which was set up in 1984 to promote the interests of ice hockey and its writers, photographers and broadcasters. Originally called the British Ice Hockey Writers Association, abbreviated to BIHWA, it changed its name in 2006 in order to reflect the change in the sport and the growth of the media covering it.

IHJUK were the custodians of the British Ice Hockey Hall of Fame until 2018. A sub-committee of members of IHJUK selected people who have made an "outstanding contribution" to the sport for induction to the Hall.

IHJUK are also responsible for the awarding of honours to players and coaches at the end of each season. The awards are:

All Star Teams
Coach of the Year Trophy
Player of the Year Trophy
Ice Hockey Annual Trophy for the leading British points scorer
British Netminder of the Year
Alan Weeks Trophy for the best British defenceman
Best British Forward
Vic Batchelder Memorial Award for the Young British Player

See also
EIHL All-Star Team
ISL All-Star Team
Professional Hockey Writers' Association (US)
Football Writers' Association (England)
Scottish Football Writers' Association

References

Ice Hockey Journalists UK website

 
Ice hockey mass media
Ice hockey organizations

Sports journalism organizations in Europe
Journalism-related professional associations
United Kingdom journalism organisations
Sports organizations established in 1984
Sports organisations of the United Kingdom
1984 establishments in the United Kingdom